Arsenate reductase (azurin) is an enzyme that catalyzes the chemical reaction

arsenite + H2O + 2 azurinox  arsenate + 2 azurinred + 2 H+

The 3 substrates of this enzyme are arsenite, water, and oxidised azurin, whereas its 3 products are arsenate, reduced azurin, and hydrogen ion.

Classification

This enzyme belongs to the family of oxidoreductases, specifically those acting on phosphorus or arsenic in donor with a copper protein as acceptor.

Nomenclature

The systematic name of this enzyme class is arsenite:azurin oxidoreductase. This enzyme is also called arsenite oxidase.

Structure and function

The enzyme contains a molybdopterin centre comprising two molybdopterin guanosine dinucleotide cofactors bound to molybdenum, a [3Fe-4S] cluster and a Rieske-type [2Fe-2S] cluster.

References

 
 

EC 1.20.9
Enzymes of unknown structure